Marina Marik-Georgieva (born August 17, 1969), is a Bulgarian former volleyball player.  

She participated at the 2002 FIVB Volleyball Women's World Championship in Germany. 
She used to play for Levski Siconco in her country.

References

External links 

2004 Olympic Games - European Qualification - Women

Living people
Bulgarian women's volleyball players
1969 births
Liberos